Cherry Blossoms is the oldest and one of the largest international social networking companies. It was established in 1974 as a catalog specializing in women from Asia. The agency printed catalogs of "personals" listings, selling addresses to customers who were then able to correspond directly with the women. Eventually, photographs supplemented text listings, then color photographs were added. As of 2001, Cherry Blossoms had evolved entirely to a web-based format.

History
According to company president Mike Krosky, Cherry Blossoms operates in over a hundred countries, with a focus on China, South America, and Southeast Asia (especially the Philippines). The company is often mentioned in news articles about the "mail order bride" industry.

Cases of abuse and murder involving couples who met via Cherry Blossoms include the case of Jack Reeves, who was convicted of murdering two of his wives.

References

External links

Alexa Page Rank for Cherry Blossoms 

Organizations established in 1974